The 2014–15 Delaware Fightin' Blue Hens men's basketball team represented the University of Delaware during the 2014–15 NCAA Division I men's basketball season. The Fightin' Blue Hens, led by ninth year head coach Monté Ross, played their home games at the Bob Carpenter Center and were members of the Colonial Athletic Association. They finished the season 10–20, 9–9 in CAA play to finish in a tie for sixth place. They lost in the quarterfinals of the CAA tournament to Northeastern.

Previous season 
The Fightin' Blue Hens finished the season 25–10, 14–2 in CAA play to win the CAA regular season championship. They were also champions of the CAA tournament to earn an automatic bid to the NCAA tournament where they lost in the second round to Michigan State.

Departures

Recruiting

Roster

Schedule

|-
!colspan=9 style="background:#00539f; color:#FFD200;"| Regular season

|-
!colspan=9 style="background:#00539f; color:#FFD200;"| CAA tournament

See also
2014–15 Delaware Fightin' Blue Hens women's basketball team

References

Delaware Fightin' Blue Hens men's basketball seasons
Delaware
Delaware Fightin' Blue Hens men's b
Delaware Fightin' Blue Hens men's b